Hunderby is a British black comedy produced by Sky and written by Julia Davis. It was first broadcast on Sky Atlantic in 2012.  The series won two awards at the British Comedy Awards in 2012; it also won Davis a BAFTA TV Award for best comedy writing. Hunderby returned in December 2015 for a second series consisting of two one-hour specials.

Plot
Set in the 1830s, this black comedy centres on Helene, a woman who is washed ashore after her ship is wrecked off the English coast. There, she is courted by Edmund, a local pastor, and they soon get married under the understanding that Helene is still pure. However, she has a dark past that she must hide from him.

When Helene moves into Edmund's home, she falls under the watchful eye of housekeeper Dorothy, who is more than a little involved in her master's life and quite obsessed with his dead first wife, Arabelle, to whom, in her opinion, Helene simply does not compare. While Helene battles to keep her past a secret, she must navigate Dorothy's devious scheming, her husband's harsh critique and a potential new love interest in the form of Dr. Foggerty.

Cast

Main characters

Supporting roles

Reception
Sam Wollaston, television critic for The Guardian, was enthusiastic about the programme. He concludes: "Hunderby is filth... the filthiest filth, but also top quality filth, and you can get away with a lot by being very good, and very funny, which it is."

Ratings
Hunderby debuted on Sky Atlantic in August 2012 with 246,000 viewers, the channel's second highest rated show of the week, after The Borgias. In subsequent weeks ratings remained high for Sky Atlantic, with figures all above 100,000. The series had 211,000 viewers.

Awards
In 2012, Hunderby won a British Comedy Award for "Best Sitcom,” and another for "Best New Comedy Programme". For "Best Sitcom,”  its competition was Rev, The Thick of It, and Twenty Twelve; for "Best New Comedy Programme,” it competed with Cardinal Burns, Moone Boy, and Alan Partridge: Welcome to the Places of My Life.

In 2013, Hunderby won Julia Davis a BAFTA Craft award for "Best Comedy Writing;” Davis was also nominated for a BAFTA TV Award in the category "Best Female Performance in a Comedy Programme.”  Hunderby itself was nominated for a BAFTA in the "Situation Comedy" category.

References

External links
 
 

2010s British black comedy television series
2012 British television series debuts
2015 British television series endings
English-language television shows
Sky Atlantic original programming
Sky sitcoms
Television shows set in England
Television series set in the 1830s